Panchrysia ornata is a species of moth of the family Noctuidae. It is found from the  Ural Mountains, through Siberia, Mongolia, Sikhote-Alin and the Paektu Mountains to Kamchatka and the Pacific coast. It is found up to altitudes of 2,400 meters.

The wingspan is 32–40 mm. There is usually one generation per year, but when conditions are favourable two generations may occur. The main flight time are the months of July and August.

The food plant of the larvae is unknown.

References

External links

catocala.narod.ru

Moths described in 1864
Moths of Europe
Plusiini
Taxa named by Otto Vasilievich Bremer